Y106.5 may refer to:

 106.5 WFYY-FM, a Hot AC formatted radio station licensed to serve Bloomsburg, Pennsylvania
 106.5 WYTE-FM, a Country formatted radio station licensed to serve Marshfield, Wisconsin
 106.5 KRYL-FM, a Country formatted radio station licensed to serve Haiku, Hawaii